The Reinhard Cumulus is a West German high-wing, strut-braced single-seat, glider that was designed by Gerhard Reinhard for amateur construction.

Design and development
Reinhard developed the Cumulus shortly after the Second World War, first flying it in 1951. The aircraft incorporated many design concepts from prewar aircraft and was similar to the Schneider Grunau Baby and Bowlus Baby Albatross. It has a modest glide ratio of 19:1.

The aircraft is built with a welded steel tube fuselage and wooden-framed wings, all covered in doped aircraft fabric covering. Its  span wing is supported by a single strut per side. The landing gear was originally a simple skid for both take-off and landing, but later versions incorporated a monowheel instead.

Specifications (Cumulus)

See also

References

1950s United States sailplanes
Homebuilt aircraft
Aircraft first flown in 1951